The Cucamonga Valley AVA is an American Viticultural Area in San Bernardino County, California.

Cucamonga Valley is a warm climate for viniculture, with summer temperatures often exceeding .  The valley floor is sandy, alluvial soils.  Pierce's disease has affected vines in the valley.

The Cucamonga Valley AVA was officially approved as an AVA in 1995 by the United States Department of Treasury as a result of a petition, written and filed in 1993 by Gino L. Filippi on behalf of area growers and vintners. The designation enables wineries to use the words Cucamonga Valley on their wine labels when utilizing at least 85% Cucamonga grapes.

History
Grape cultivation began in the Cucamonga Valley in 1838 by Tiburcio Tapia on the Rancho Cucamonga, a Mexican land grant in Alta California. In 1859 rancher John Rains began large vine plantings in Cucamonga, introducing agriculture on a large scale to replace traditional cattle and sheep raising in the region. By 1917 the Cucamonga-Guasti vineyards spanned over 20,000 acres, and Secondo Guasti was advertising his vineyard as "The Largest in the World."

When Prohibition began in 1920, the Cucamonga Valley produced more wine grapes than Napa County and Sonoma County combined.  The former Mission Vineyard winery, later known as the Virginia Dare Winery, was established in 1910 in Rancho Cucamonga (town). Others included the Thomas Brothers Winery, G. Filippi and Son Winery, and Ellena Bros./Regina Winery.

Following Prohibition (1919-1933) and its end, the wine industry and other agricultural businesses in the Cucamonga Valley faced increasing pressure from the urban expansion of Los Angeles and Orange County.  During the 1970s agricultural land in the AVA underwent massive conversion and loss to suburbanization, for families from those counties seeking affordable housing.

The Joseph Filippi Winery & Vineyards and other vintners and growers in the area worked to attain the AVA designation, and have been bringing back winemaking to the Cucamonga Valley.

Wineries

See also
Cucamonga Winery

References

External links
 
 Federal Ruling, Establishment of Cucamonga Valley AVA
 http://articles.latimes.com/1994-05-19/food/fo-59395_1_cucamonga-valley

American Viticultural Areas
American Viticultural Areas of Southern California
Geography of San Bernardino County, California
History of San Bernardino County, California
Inland Empire
Pomona Valley
American Viticultural Areas of California
1985 establishments in California